A  is a recorded collection of dialogues between a pupil and a rōshi (a Zen Buddhist teacher). Zen tradition values direct experience and communication over scriptures. (Some teachers go so far as to instruct their pupils to tear up their scriptures.) However, sometimes the mondō acts as a guide on the method of instruction.

One example of a non-Buddhist mondō is the Sokuratesu-no-mondō, the Japanese translation of the "Socratic method", whereby Socrates asked his students questions in order to elicit the innate truth from assumed facts

External links
A brief synopsis of Zen Buddhism from the BBC website

Zen
Zen texts
Japanese Buddhist literature